The Ordinance of 9 August 1944 was a constitutional law enacted by the Provisional Government of the French Republic (GPRF) during the Liberation of France which re-established republican rule of law in mainland France after four years of occupation by Nazi Germany and control by the collaborationist Vichy regime.

Background 

The refusal to consider the Vichy regime as a legally constituted authority was a constant in the Free France founded by Charles . Already in his Brazzaville Manifesto of 27 October 1940, the general had proclaimed that there was no longer a French government, and that "the Vichy-based organization that claims to bear this name is unconstitutional and submits to the invader", even as he published on the same day the first Ordinance of Free France establishing the Empire Defense Council, which organized "the legal authority in all parts of the [colonial] Empire liberated from control of the enemy ... based on French legislation prior to 23 June 1940."

Contents

Promulgated in Algiers by the GPRF led by General , the ordinance expunged all trappings of legality from the Vichy regime, declaring all constitutional regulatory texts enacted by the regime of Pétain and Laval to be void ab initio, beginning with the Constitutional Law of 10 July 1940. More generally, this ordinance organized the conditions for the transition from the norms in force under Vichy, to republican norms, in the historical context of the Liberation.

Through the text of this ordinance Free France, embodied by the GPRF and led by General , retroactively constituted itself as the continuous and uninterrupted extension of the French Republic. It proclaimed the Vichy regime stripped of all right to present itself as the legal successor of the Third Republic.

Additionally, by explicitly linking France's mode of government to the Republic, the ordinance endorsed a republican vision of France that precluded any legitimacy for a modification of this form of government.

Although the ordinance declared that all Vichy laws were null and void, as reversing all Vichy decisions during the previous four years was impractical, it also stated that only those explicitly listed were invalid.

See also 

 Charles de Gaulle
 Clandestine press of the French Resistance
 Free France
 French Constitution of 27 October 1946
 French Fourth Republic
 French Third Republic
 Liberation of France

References

Notes

Footnotes

Works cited 

 
 

 , a translation of the French:

Further reading 

 

 

1944 in France
1944 documents
August 1944 events
Government of France
Legal history of France
Military history of France during World War II
France in World War II
Modern history of France
Politics of World War II